Paul Senn (14 August 1901, in Rothrist – 25 April 1953) was a Swiss photographer.

1901 births
1953 deaths
People from Zofingen District
Swiss Calvinist and Reformed Christians
Swiss photographers